This is a list of National Labour MPs.  It includes all Members of Parliament who sat in the British House of Commons who were sponsored by the National Labour Organisation.

Abstainers

Five Labour MPs are known to have deliberately abstained from voting on 8 September 1931 in the first House of Commons division (vote) called after the formation of the National Government. Of the five, only one (Richard Denman) subsequently became a National Labour MP. The identities of the other four who had indicated a degree of alienation from the Labour Party and of support for the National Government, even if not committing themselves to it absolutely.

 Sir Ralph Norman Angell (Bradford North) voted against the Government in a division the following day, but announced his decision not to seek re-election on 24 September 1931 while stressing that he was not leaving the Labour Party.
 Edith Picton-Turbervill (The Wrekin) also voted against the Government in a division the following day. She was re-adopted as the Labour candidate for her constituency at the 1931 general election but was defeated for re-election. 
 George Russell Strauss (Lambeth North) also voted against the Government in a division the following day. Although defeated for re-election in 1931, he returned in a 1934 by-election at which he defeated a National Labour candidate, and then served until he retired in 1979.
 Josiah Clement Wedgwood (Newcastle-under-Lyme) first voted against the Government on 14 September 1931. As a member of the Independent Labour Party he refused to sign a pledge to abide by the standing orders of the Parliamentary Labour Party and so fought for re-election without official endorsement at the 1931 general election, but was re-elected unopposed. He was readmitted to the PLP and served until elevated to the Peerage in 1942.

Graphical representation

References

National Labour
 MPs